Papua New Guinea competed as the host nation at the 2015 Pacific Games in Port Moresby, Papua New Guinea from 4 to 18 July 2015. Team PNG listed 625 competitors across all 28 disciplines as of 4 July 2015.

Athletics

Papua New Guinea qualified 69 athletes in track and field (including parasport events) for the 2015 Games:

Men
Track and road events

Field events

Combined events – Decathlon

Para events - Track and Field

Women
Track and road events

Field events

Combined events – Heptathlon

Para events

Basketball

Papua New Guinea qualified men's and women's teams in basketball (28 athletes):
 
Women 
 Betty Angula
 Emma Nicole Daroa
 Julie-Anne Diro
 Opa Opai Eko
 Mary Elavo
 Rosa Lausi Kairi
 Emily Koivi
 Marca Leah Muri
 Josie Vigeel Sam
 Nwster Sape
 Nape Waka
 Louisa Wallace

Men 
 Moses Lune Apiko
 Gabriel Frank Elavo
 Aron Genai Farmer
 Robert Avosa Kave
 Matineng-Iakah Leahy
 Mika John Loko
 Apia Muri
 Dia Muri
 Purari Muri
 Wally Parapa
 Liam Allan Wright
 Lloyd James Wright

Beach volleyball

Papua New Guinea qualified four athletes in beach volleyball:

Women
 Alice Ito
 Diane Moia

Men
 Richard Kilarupa
 Mea Moha

Bodybuilding

Women
 Pau Moses
 Misa Avefa
Men
 Pascol Sabin
 Michael Mondo
 Steve Bomal
  Mark Donald
  Selen Jim
  Wilfred Kurua
  Jack Viyufa
 Donald Kaiwi

Boxing

PNG qualified 13 athletes in boxing:

Women
Debbie Baki Koare (75 kg)
Raphaella Baki (60 kg)
Philo Magaiva (51 kg)

Men
Andrew Aisaga (69 kg)
Tom Boga (64 kg)
Robert Gabriel (81 kg)
Thadius Katua (60 kg)
Charles Keama (49 kg)
Jonathan Keama (75 kg)
Vincent Kora (91 kg)
Lui Magaiva (52 kg)
Henry Uming (56 kg)
Lucas Wakore (91 kg+)

Cricket

PNG qualified men's and women's teams in cricket (26 players):

 Women
Women's tournament.
 Kaia Arua
 Helen Buruka
 Boni David
 Veru Kila Frank
 Kopi John
 Varoi Igo Morea
 Ravini Oa
 Konio Oala
 Norma Ovasuru
 Tanya Ruma
 Pauke Siaka
 Brenda Hoi Tau
 Mairi Tom

Men
Men's tournament.
 Christopher Ralai Amini
 Dogodo Bau
 Kohu Dai
 Kiplin Doriga
 Raymond Haoda
 Ryley Hekure
 Hiri Hiri
 Jason Kila
 Alei Nao
 Nosaina Pokana
 Raho Sam
 Joel Tom
 Vagi Morea

Field hockey

Women
 Ruby Kisapai
 Rosemary Miria
 Martina Julius Dusty
 Kari Raurela
 Vanessa Perry Michael
 Alice Fred
 Jessica Kevan
 Carolyn Mulina
 Terry Kiapin
Men
 Yahie Kusunan
 Milton Kisapai
 Hussein Lowah
 Rex Loth
 Eddie Gebo
 Sapau Tapo
 Michael Pomat
 Nelson Tom
 Martin Kanamon

Football

Papua New Guinea qualified men's and women's teams in football (46 athletes):

Women
 – Women's tournament. 
Fidelma Watpore
Sandra Birum
Georgina Kaikas
Meagen Wayon Gunemba
Ramona Quintina Padio
Kesai Kotome
Dorcas Sesevo
Lucy Philomena Maino
Grace Steven
Lace Kunei
Joelyn Aimi
Aida Alice Gerota
Belinda Giada
Deslyn Siniu
Barbara Muta
Jenisa Ulengit
Judith Kepulau Gunemba
Carolyn Obi
Yvonne Molong Gabong
Nicolla Ruth Niaman
Talitha Irakau
Fatima Nabase Rama
Marie Rex Arua Kaipu
Men
 – Men's tournament.

Head coach:  Ricki Herbert

Golf

Women
 Margaret Lavaki
 Kristine Seko
 Hazel Martin
 Margaret Lavaki
 Roslyn Taufa
Men
 Soti Dinki
 Steven George
 Wally Ilake
 Brian Taikiri

Karate

Women 
 Crystal Elizabeth Raka Mari
 Dorish Karomo
 Jacklyn Barney
 Lera Kose
 Catherine Wilson
 Sarah Esther Ande
 Gantianna Joseph
 Francillia Kokin
 Joancherry Gou Revui
 Gewa Bianca Rupa
 Francillia Kokin
Men
 Cosmas Walio Saliawali
 Ishmael Stanley
 Naorei Joseph
 John Besty Kajona
 Ernest Charles Nuli
 Sailas Gabriel Piskaut
 Nigel Bana
 Vincent Quentin Bougen
 Leonard Robinson Gariadi
 Eddie Martin
 Siwari Matus
 Andrew Molen
 Dominic Sipapi

Lawn bowls

Women
 Ju Melissa Carlo
 Cesley Simbinali
 Mondin Tiba
 Angela Simbinali
 Catherine Wimp

Men
 Matu Matso Bazo
 Peter Juni
 Polin Senai Pomaliu
 Lucas Roika
 Anthony Nipue Yogiyo

Netball

 Lua Rikis
 Herronie Hazel Daera
 Susan Makara Wellington
 Margaret Ari Eka
 Tiata Maria Baldwin
 Jacklyn Metahera Lahari
 Shanna Jennifer Dringo
 Nerrie Adula
 Raka Nope
 Kilala Sunema Owen
 Winnie Mavara
 Jeperth Tulapi

Outrigger canoeing

Women
 Rhonda Davara
 Nona Gamoga
 Christina Geno
 Vavine Guria
 Mary Holland
 Taluva Iamo
 Mauri Ila
 Noeleen Kapi
 Kone Keni
 Tegana Keto
 Hane Kevau
 Vagi Kila
 Ailima Kini
 Melissa Maino
 Gloria Ogera
 Judy Claire Ovia
 Susan Paisoi
 Evanelia Boupang Peni
 Nellie Tetaga
 Beverlyn Valina
Men
 Veari Veari
 Christopher Morea

Powerlifting

Women
 Hitolo Kevau
 Navillie Benson
 Linda Pulsan
 Dobi Mea
 Belinda Umang
 Meteng Wak – disqualified (WADA).
 Melissa Tikio
Men
 Vagi Henry
 Livingstone Sokoli
 Anderson Mangela
 Kenny Naime
 Henry Kelo
 Brown Bolong
 Kalau Andrew
 Alfred Mel

Rugby league nines

 Stargroth Amean
 Kato Ben Ottio
 Gahuna Silas
 Noel Zeming
 Rex Yellon
 Adex Wera
 Willie Minoga
 Henry Noki
 Thompson Teteh
 Watson Boas
 Brandy Peter
 Oti Tony Bland
 Israel Eliab
 David Lapua
 Ase Boas
 Wartovo Puara

Rugby sevens

 Women
 – Women's tournament.
 Cassandra Samson
 Alice Alois
 Amelia Kuk
 Lynette Kwarula
 Trisilla Rema
 Dulcie Bomai
 Menda Ipat
 Freda Waula
 Kymlie Rapilla
 Naomi Alapi
 Geua Larry
 Joanna Lagona

 Men
4th – Men's tournament.
 Henry Kalua
 Stanis Susuve
 Butler Morris
 Tisa Kautu
 Arthur Clement
 William Rew
 Max Vali
 Hensley Peter
 Eugene Tokavai
 Wesley Vali
 Jordan Tkatchenko
 Hubert Tseraha

Sailing

Women
 Rose Lee Numa
 Janet Vaa
Men
 Markson Charlie
  John Numa
 Navu Gerea Buggsy Charlie
 Boisen Numa
 Upu Navu Kila
 Harry Haro

Shooting

PNG qualified 13 athletes in shooting:

Women
 Carmelita de Guzman Donald 
 Beatrice Bisia Geita 
 Nancy Geita 
 Koiogulei Henry 
 Tania Mairi  – 10 m air pistol female. 
 Winifred Warubele Sauna

Men
 George Nicholas Constantinou 
 Angus William Donald 
 Darcy Leahy 
 Peter Leahy 
 Sibona Mairi 
 Danny Wanma 
 Jason Yip

Softball

 Addie Lino Amos
 Anna Dick
 Annette Maradi
 Antonia Marang Kinit
 Beverly Niaweseu Pasen
 Emma Markis
 Florence Daple
 Dhiadre Mautu
 Hennie Warpin
 Judy Nauvana
 Juliet Geredah Seri
 Lisa Polum
 Nadia Bais
 Siloru Miriam Zale
 Tara Elizaberth Tomangana
 Tahillah Fong
 Tenisha Takau Kuveu
 Encie NK Simitap
 Joyce Inguba
 Lisa Malum
 Marina Millingin
 Natasha Pilak

Squash

Women
 Nicole Ravu Gibbs
 Sheila Rhonda Morove
 Lynette Vai
 Eli Webb
 Imong Brooksbank
Men
 Moreaina Wei
 Kerry Walsh
 Robin Morove
 Schubert Maketu
 Suari Madako Suari Jnr
 Lokes Brooksbank

Swimming

PNG announced a team of 30 swimmers in April 2015, with the open-water team yet to be selected. The final team included 32 athletes qualified for the 2015 Games in swimming:

Men

Women

Mixed

Table tennis

Papua New Guinea qualified 11 athletes in table tennis (including parasport events) for the 2015 Games:

Men
 Haoda Agari 
 Jackson Morea Kariko
 David Rea Loi
 Geoffrey Loi
 Gasika Sepa
 David Thomas

Women
 Idau Boni Chris
 Geru Lohia
 Gagina Mape
 Dia Isi Morea
 Maryanne Robert Loi

Taekwondo

PNG qualified 14 athletes in taekwondo:

Women
Rose Tona (46 kg)
Theresa Tona (53 kg)
Doris David (53 kg)
Stephanie Kombo (63 kg)
Samantha Kassman (67 kg)
Noelyn Hetana (67 kg)

Men
Bobby Willie (54 kg)
Max Kassman (63 kg)
Rainner Peni(68 kg)
Henry Ori (74 kg)
Jonathan Paskalis (80 kg)
Colland Kokin (87 kg)
Ivan Kassman(87 kg)
Sam Ware(87 kg)
Steven Tommy (Reserve)(68 kg)

Tennis

Singles

Doubles

Touch rugby

Papua New Guinea qualified men's and women's teams in touch rugby (38 athletes, maximum 14 per team):

Men
 – Men's tournament.
 Ronald Bibiken
 Kora Simon Kora David 
 Eugene Miro Eka 
 Paul Latoro Kasisie 
 Harry Kea 
 William Ken 
 Kele Lessy 
 Diallo Honasan Luana 
 Paul Matuta 
 Uari Sarufa Saea 
 Bobby Vavona 
 Samuel Henao Vetu 
 Elison Waluka 
 
 Francis Alu 
 Jerry Borg 
 Philip Frank 
 Fitzerald Jee
 Charlie Rupa 
 Marlon Heistar Steven
 Norman Vavona
 Morris Walter

Women
 – Women's tournament.
 Maria Alu 
 Pauline Margaret Arazi 
 Patiyoko Apiganasa Bernard 
 Jenny Carol 
 Grace Angela Harriette Kouba 
 Natalie Naomi Kuper 
 Margaret Luke 
 Marie Max Tuu 
 Nadya Taubuso 
 Monica Teite 
 Joylyne Tikot 
 Diane Vetu 
 Angelena Watego 
 Vavine Markie Yore
 
 Rose Eva 
 Doris Koraea 
 Velma Tsang

Triathlon

Women
 Rosemary Arua Ralfe
 Rachel Sapery James
Men
 Mairi Karl Feeger
 Casmer Kapali Kamangip
 Troy David Kua

Volleyball

Women
 Zoe Stella Sarea Awadu
 Kemmy Manoni
 Clear Vele
 Leontine Tina Ono
 Jayna Bernard
 Aileen Gima
 Perpetua Awadu
 Isa Hicks
 Emily Afali Bae
 Luana Travertz
 Michelle Shirley Walo
 Lois Garena
 Bibina Sina Paloa
Men

Weightlifting

Papua New Guinea entered 15 weightlifters (8 men and 7 women) in 13 categories. The athletes won a total of 21 medals, 13 of them gold.

Men

Women

References

2015 in Papua New Guinean sport
Nations at the 2015 Pacific Games
Papua New Guinea at the Pacific Games